Beside me  (original title in Romanian: Coborâm la prima) is an independent Romanian movie released in 2018, three years after the disaster at Colectiv where 64 people lost their life. It is directed by Tedy Necula,  a famous Romanian motivational speaker that has tetraparesis. The plot takes place one day after the disaster in a metro that is stuck between 1 Mai and Grivita stations. It is an inspirational movie that shows that a disaster can bring strangers together. It features an interesting cast which includes Constantin Cotimanis, Adrian Păduraru, Teodora Mareș, Victoria Cociaș-Șerban, Emilian Oprea, Constantin Drăgănescu, Ela Ionescu, Dan Murzea and Iulia Dumitru. The movie was shot partially in a metro car and the rest in a built set, in Bucharest. It was released in Romanian theaters on October 26, 2018. On Cinemagia, the box office is 53.828,67 USD.

Plot 
In the morning after the Colectiv club fire, several strangers remain blocked in the metro between two subway stations. The metro contains people dealing with personal issues, on top of which is added the tragedy of the Colectiv disaster. At a certain point, they start communicating and sharing their problems with each other. To tell the story of the movie is to tell the stories of the characters. There is no main character in this film. Each and every story has its purpose and tries to deal with current issues in Romanian society. As such, we have:

 a Moldavian middle-aged woman who has been searching for a relationship on dating apps. She is supposed to be the comic release of the movie. She befriends the businessman in the metro and starts flirting with him but in the end, he turns out to be a liar, having a pregnant wife in the hospital. (played by Iulia Dumitru and Emilian Oprea)
 a dysfunctional couple that has money trouble. They try to reconcile in the metro. In addition, at the start of the movie the husband has his wallet stolen which contained most of their money. They are played by Adrian Paduraru and Teodora Mares, which is a commemoration of the movie Confessions of Love (Declarație de dragoste), where they played together
 a  man newly released from the prison that has a connection with a mother with a handicapped child. He is extremely kind to the child, but after the mother finds out that he is an ex-prisoner she decides to not talk to him anymore. During the movie, we find out that the man was in prison for something he did not commit so the mother realizes that she shouldn`t judge a book by its cover. Moreover, at the end of the movie, it is revealed that she was the one who stole the wallet of the man who had money problems because she couldn`t afford to pay for her child's treatments. Upon this discovery, the man decides to give her the money. (played by Dan Murzea, Ela Ionescu and Tomas Ghela)
 a stereotypical old Romanian couple that judges everyone in the metro, especially a young boy who they think is a drug addict. During the movie, they start talking with him and realize that he is a nice and understanding person. The old man has a breakdown and he is helped by the woman with the handicapped child because she is also a nurse. After this, they understand that even if they are not young anymore, they still matter and their love still matters. (played by Constantin Drăgănescu and Victoria Cociaș)
 another couple has just found out that their child was in the Colectiv fire and had died. (played by Gavril Petru and Ela Ionescu)
 a priest that is concealing his profession because of the fear of being bullied. After the Colectiv fire, a lot of priests blamed the people's taste in music for the catastrophe, as such, all the priests were targeted by the Romanian society. He is also the one who gives the story of the movie meaning. He is the voice of reason and gives inspiring speeches during the movie. He tells everyone that it is not a coincidence that the metro got stuck and that it happened so that they could talk and understand each other with all their problems and fears. (played by Constantin Cotimaniș)
 a group of young people that have friends that were at the nightclub and are desperately trying to get a hold of them

Cast 

 Teodora Mareș as the wife
 Adrian Păduraru as the husband   
 Constantin Cotimanis as the priest
 Tudorel Filimon as the man who plays the accordion
 Emilian Oprea as the businessman
 Iulia Dumitru as the Moldavian woman
 Constantin Drăgănescu as the old man
 Victoria Cociaș as the old woman
 Gavril Pătru as the father
 Ela Ionescu as the mother of the handicapped child
 Grumăzescu Cezar as the gay man
 Iulian Burciu as a ruffian
 Iulia Alexandra Neacșu as a student
 Ada Dumitru as a student
 Dan Murzea as an ex-prisoner
 Ionuț Gurgu  as a traveler
 Andrei Eftene as a hipster
 Radu Catana as a student

Production 
The movie entered cinemas on the 26th of October 2018.

The main part of the movie was shot inside an actual metro but because of the low budget, it couldn`t be shot in its entirety. As such, an improvised metro was made in a production room in the studio Filmărie. Tedy Necula stated that he and his team built the metro in the production room in just 7 days.

Music 
The soundtrack has two songs by the band Goodbye to Gravity, which was the band playing that night in Colectiv Club when the fire started. Tedy Necula said in an interview for Digi24 that he had the idea of the movie for several years but he wanted to link it to an important day for Romanians so he decided to put the story the second day after the Colectiv club fire. He wanted to have the music from the Goodbye to Gravity band so that the message would be more powerful.

Reception 
The movie was received well by the critics. They said that it was not just a movie about the Colectiv club fire. It was also meant to be taken as an inspirational film that spread kindness and humanity in Romanian society. Vice wrote that it is a movie that shows how people are changed by a tragedy. The famous line of the movie, "We are strangers until something unites us" has become a staple of the Colectiv tragedy. Moreover, it impressed critics with the mixture of feelings that it made people feel.

Claudia Moscovici writes that it is a "cinematic thought-experiment".

Awards 

 2018 - Militello Film Festival - Best editing (Ana Țurcanu)
 2018 - Indie IPIFF - Best debut (Tedy Necula)

See also 

 Colectiv nightclub fire
 Goodbye to Gravity

References

External links 

 Coborâm la prima at IMDb 
 Coborâm la prima at Cinemagia

Bibliography 

  
 
 
 

2018 films
Romanian drama films